Mazé-Milon is a commune in the Maine-et-Loire department of western France. The municipality was established on 1 January 2016 and consists of the former communes of Mazé and Fontaine-Milon.

Population
The population data given in the table below refer to the commune in its geography as of January 2020.

See also 
Communes of the Maine-et-Loire department

References 

Communes of Maine-et-Loire
States and territories established in 2016